Karatina University is a public university in the town of Karatina, in central Kenya.

History
Karatina University was founded in 2007 as a Moi University campus for central Kenya, called the Moi University Central Kenya Campus. Located about 15 km north of the town of Karatina, it had an original intake of 100 students. Three years later, in 2010, it was upgraded to a constituent college of Moi University, and renamed Karatina University College. In 2013, the institution was declared a university in its own right, and was renamed Karatina University.

Campus

Karatina University's main campus is located at Kagochi, the site of the former Karatina University College about 15 km from Karatina town. Further sites are located in the town of Nanyuki and in the settlement of Itiati, the latter being home to the university's School of Education and Social Sciences.

The Vice Chancellor of Karatina University is Prof. Mucai Muchiri.

Structure and organisation
Karatina University comprises five academic schools, which are each divided into different departments:

 School of Agriculture & Biotechnology;
 School of Business;
 School of Education & Social Sciences;
 School of Natural Resources & Environmental Studies;
 School of Pure and Applied Sciences;

School of Agriculture and Biotechnology
Food Science and Nutrition
Agricultural Resource Economics
Crop Science

School of Business Studies
Business and Entrepreneurship
Human Resources Development
Tourism and Hospitality Management
Economics and National Development

School of Education and Social Science
Humanities & Languages
Social Sciences
Education Foundation
Planning and Curriculum
Psychology and Communication Technology

School of Natural Resources & Environmental Studies
Natural Resources
Environmental Studies
Aquaculture and Fisheries Management
Earth Sciences and Geo-informatics

School of Pure and Applied Sciences
Mathematics, Statistics & Actuarial Sciences
Computer Science
Physical Sciences
Biological Sciences

Academic profile

Rankings
Karatina University is currently ranked number 19 in Kenya on Webometrics Ranking of World Universities, which measures an institution's web presence.

References

External links
Karatina University - Official website

Universities and colleges in Kenya
Educational institutions established in 2013
2013 establishments in Kenya